Crouching Woman is a bronze sculpture by Auguste Rodin.

Versions
Originally modeled in 1880–1882, and enlarged in 1907–1911, it was cast in 1962.
It is in the Hirshhorn Museum and Sculpture Garden. The Portland Art Museum has a copy in its Evan H. Roberts Memorial Sculpture Collection.

See also
List of sculptures by Auguste Rodin
List of public art in Washington, D.C., Ward 2

References

External links
Rodin: The B. Gerald Cantor Collection, a full text exhibition catalog from The Metropolitan Museum of Art. which contains material on Crouching Woman

Sculptures by Auguste Rodin
Sculptures of women
1882 sculptures
Hirshhorn Museum and Sculpture Garden
Sculptures of the Musée Rodin
Sculptures of the Smithsonian Institution
Bronze sculptures in Washington, D.C.
Nude sculptures in Washington, D.C.
Outdoor sculptures in Washington, D.C.
Sculptures of women in Washington, D.C.
Nude sculptures in Oregon
Sculptures of women in Oregon
Collection of the Portland Art Museum